Multan (also Romanized as Mūltān) is a village in Zaboli Rural District, in the Central District of Mehrestan County, Sistan and Baluchestan Province, Iran. At the 2006 census, its population was 867, in 181 families.

References 

Populated places in Mehrestan County